Whau Valley is a suburb of Whangārei, in Northland Region, New Zealand. State Highway 1 runs through it. The valley was named for the whau trees which grew there in the 1850s.

At the end of the 4 km long Whau Valley Road is the principal water reservoir for Whangārei City, created by the Whau Valley Earth Dam. The reservoir is stocked with rainbow and brown trout.

History 
Some of the early settlers in what was then called Whauwhau Valley were William Hawken and his family, who arrived in 1859, and John MacDonald and his family, in 1860. The MacDonald family was part of the group of people from Nova Scotia who settled in the Whangārei area.

Coal was discovered in the Whauwhau Valley in the 1860s. Henry Walton and William Grahame took a 99 lease on the land and developed a mine. A wooden tramway was built from the mine to the Hātea River so coal wagons could be pulled by horses to be loaded onto ships. The railway line between Kamo and Whangārei, opened in 1882, replaced the tramway.

Demographics

Whau Valley had a population of 2,799 at the 2018 New Zealand census, an increase of 261 people (10.3%) since the 2013 census, and an increase of 198 people (7.6%) since the 2006 census. There were 1,044 households, comprising 1,308 males and 1,491 females, giving a sex ratio of 0.88 males per female. The median age was 44.4 years (compared with 37.4 years nationally), with 510 people (18.2%) aged under 15 years, 480 (17.1%) aged 15 to 29, 1,140 (40.7%) aged 30 to 64, and 669 (23.9%) aged 65 or older.

Ethnicities were 77.5% European/Pākehā, 26.2% Māori, 3.8% Pacific peoples, 7.3% Asian, and 2.5% other ethnicities. People may identify with more than one ethnicity.

The percentage of people born overseas was 18.6, compared with 27.1% nationally.

Although some people chose not to answer the census's question about religious affiliation, 45.9% had no religion, 41.7% were Christian, 1.0% were Hindu, 0.4% were Buddhist and 2.8% had other religions.

Of those at least 15 years old, 411 (18.0%) people had a bachelor's or higher degree, and 495 (21.6%) people had no formal qualifications. The median income was $25,500, compared with $31,800 nationally. 321 people (14.0%) earned over $70,000 compared to 17.2% nationally. The employment status of those at least 15 was that 972 (42.5%) people were employed full-time, 315 (13.8%) were part-time, and 120 (5.2%) were unemployed.

Education 
Whau Valley School is a contributing primary (years 1-6) school with a roll of  students as of 

St Francis Xavier School is a Catholic contributing primary (years 1-6) school with a roll of  students as of 

Whangarei Adventist Christian School is a full primary (years 1-8) school with a roll of  students as of 

All these schools are coeducational. St Francis Xavier and Whangarei Adventist schools are state integrated.

Notes

External links
 St Francis Xavier School website
 Whau Valley School website

Suburbs of Whangārei
Populated places in the Northland Region
Valleys of New Zealand